This page is a list of species of the order Insectivora discovered in the 2000s. See also parent page List of mammals described in the 2000s.

Notiosorex cockrumi (2004)
In 2004, a new species of desert shrew was identified in Arizona, and named Notiosorex cockrumi.  The tiny shrew, which is as light as a penny, is the first new mammal species to be found in Arizona since 1977.  It is one of at least four species of the genus Notiosorex.

References

Mammals
Eulipotyphla